Ulysses Against the Son of Hercules  is a 1962  peplum film directed by Mario Caiano.

Plot
Hercules captures Ulysses, during the latter's return to Ithaca, by order of Zeus.
The hero intends to bring him to Polyphemus, who was blinded by Ulysses years before, but during the journey, the two heroes are captured by half-men and half-bird beings. After managing to escape, Ulysses is made prisoner again, this time by the Troglodytae; Hercules carries on his journey and arrives in Greece, coming to the father of his fiancée Helena to set up an expedition against the monster people who wants to kill Ulysses.

Cast 

 Georges Marchal: Ulysses
 Mike Lane: Hercules(credited as Michael Lane)
 Alessandra Panaro: Helena 
 Dominique Boschero: Queen
 Raffaele Pisu:  Assur
 Gabriele Tinti: Mercuro 
 Yvette Lebon: Hera
 Raf Baldassarre: Leuco 
 Tino Bianchi: King Ircano
 Gianni Santuccio: Lagos  
 Raffaella Carrà: Adraste

Production
The film was shot on location at the Canary Islands in Spain.

Release
Ulysses Against the Son of Hercules was released in Italy on 3 February 1962. The film was released in the United States in 1964 with a 99-minute running time. It was released to television in the United States with a 91-minute running time. The film has also been released as Ulysses Against Hercules.

It has been released on home video by Alpha Video.

References

Sources

External links

Ulysses Against the Son of Hercules at Variety Distribution

1960s fantasy adventure films
Italian fantasy adventure films
Peplum films
Films directed by Mario Caiano
Films about Heracles
Films based on the Odyssey
Films set in ancient Greece
Films scored by Angelo Francesco Lavagnino
Sword and sandal films
1960s Italian films